Ryan Helm (born July 24, 1982) is an American heavy metal musician from Nevada, Missouri. He is best known as the former rhythm guitarist of the band Demon Hunter. He currently resides in Winston-Salem, North Carolina where he also owns and operates Helm's Deep recording studio.

Career

The Ascendicate (2008–09)
Ryan Helm began his career playing guitar and singing back up vocals in The Ascendicate (which was originally called The 7 Method) from 1999 to 2012. During this time, he helped write and record their first album, To Die as Kings. Though Helm never officially left the band, it is understood that they are on an "indefinite hiatus" and will not likely return to the studio or stage.

Demon Hunter (2009–2011)
On December 16, 2009, Helm was announced as Demon Hunter's new permanent rhythm guitarist and official replacement for founding member Don Clark. He appears on the band's 2010 album, The World Is a Thorn. From 2009 to 2011, Helm performed exclusively with Demon hunter until announcing his official departure from the band in December 2011. Helm stated that the departure “was inevitable; however, it was on good terms.”

Damien Deadson (2011–present)
In 2010, Helm began working on a side project known as Damien Deadson to take a break from playing guitar and pursue his interest in singing. Since his departure from Demon Hunter, Helm has stated that he will be performing with Damien Deadson full-time as of 2012. Damien Deadson's first album A Warm and Dark Embrace was released in January 2012.

Discography

The Ascendicate
 To Die as Kings (2009)

Demon Hunter
 The World Is a Thorn (2010)

Damien Deadson
 A Warm and Dark Embrace (2012)

References

External links
 Demon Hunter Official site
 Ryan Helm on The PRP
 Review of Damien Deadson's A Warm and Dark Embrace

1982 births
Living people
American heavy metal guitarists
Solid State Records artists
21st-century American guitarists